Erivan Anomalous Blue Polyommatus eriwanensis is a butterfly in the family Lycaenidae and the genus Polyommatus. It was described by Walter Forster in 1960.

Life cycle

The larvae feed on Astragalus species, although the particular species is still not known. The flight period is from mid-June till mid-July.

Habitat
Erivan Anomalous Blue inhabits calcareous grasslands in Armenia at the elevation from 1,200 to 2,200m above sea level.

Conservation
Erivan Anomalous Blue is not evaluated for IUCN Red List and for European Red List of Butterflies. At the national level it is included in Armenian Red Book of Animals, as Endangered (B1a+B2a).

References

Butterflies described in 1960
eriwanensis
Butterflies of Europe
Butterflies of Asia